The Goiânia Microregion is a region in central Goiás state, Brazil.  It includes 17 municipalities with a population of 2,032,305 (2007) in a total area of 6,848.00 km2.

The most important cities are Goiânia (1,244.645 inhabitants), Aparecida de Goiânia (475,303 inhabitants), and Trindade (97,491 inhabitants).

The smallest municipality in population is Santo Antônio de Goiás with 3,893 inhabitants.

The largest municipality in area is Bela Vista de Goiás with 1,280.9 km2.  The smallest is Terezópolis de Goiás with 107.3 km2.

Municipalities 
The microregion consists of the following municipalities:
Abadia de Goiás
Aparecida de Goiânia
Aragoiânia
Bela Vista de Goiás
Bonfinópolis
Caldazinha
Goianápolis
Goiânia
Goianira
Guapó
Hidrolândia
Leopoldo de Bulhões
Nerópolis
Santo Antônio de Goiás
Senador Canedo
Terezópolis de Goiás
Trindade

See also
List of municipalities in Goiás
Microregions of Goiás

References

Microregions of Goiás